Robert Swann may refer to:

Robert L. Swann (comptroller of Maryland) (born 1935), comptroller of the State of Maryland in the United States
Robert L. Swann (military lawyer), American lawyer, and colonel in the United States Armed Services
Robert Swann, co-founder of Alphamosaic
Robert Swann (land trust pioneer) (1918–2003), founder of the E. F. Schumacher Society
Robert Swann (actor) (1945–2006), British actor

See also
Robert Swan (born 1956), Antarctic explorer
Robert Swan (alpine skier) (born 1943), Canadian former alpine skier